Death and Nightingales is a 1992 novel by Irish writer Eugene McCabe.

Plot
1883, County Fermanagh, Ireland. On Beth Winters' twenty-third birthday, decades of pain and betrayal finally build to a devastating climax.

Reception
Michael Ondaatje described Death and Nightingales as "a deeply moving, powerful, and unforgettable book." The Anglo-Celt called it a "modern classic."

Adaptation
In 2018, a three-part television adaptation with the same name, starring Jamie Dornan, Matthew Rhys and Ann Skelly was broadcast. It was produced by Andy Serkis and Jonathan Cavendish's studio, The Imaginarium.

References

1992 Irish novels
Irish historical novels
Vintage Books books
Novels set in the 1880s